Cour is a surname. Notable people with the name include:

Ajeet Cour (born 1934), Indian writer
Glenys Cour (born 1924), Welsh artist
Pierre Cour (1924–1995), French songwriter

See also
 Coursera (NYSE: COUR), American online education company

 Cours (disambiguation)
 La Cour, a surname
 De la Cour, a surname